Lobanilia is a plant genus of the family Euphorbiaceae and the sole genus of the subtribe Lobaniliinae. It was first described as a genus in 1989 and is endemic to Madagascar.

Species
 Lobanilia asterothrix Radcl.-Sm.
 Lobanilia bakeriana (Baill.) Radcl.-Sm.
 Lobanilia claoxyloides Radcl.-Sm.
 Lobanilia crotonoides Radcl.-Sm.
 Lobanilia hirtella (Baill.) Radcl.-Sm.
 Lobanilia luteobrunnea (Baker) Radcl.-Sm.
 Lobanilia ovalis (Baill.) Radcl.-Sm.

References

Acalypheae
Endemic flora of Madagascar
Euphorbiaceae genera